Protoboarmia is a genus of moths in the family Geometridae described by James Halliday McDunnough in 1820.

Species
Protoboarmia simpliciaria (Leech, 1897)
Protoboarmia porcelaria (Guenée, 1857) – porcelain gray, dash-lined looper

References

Boarmiini
Geometridae genera
Taxa named by James Halliday McDunnough